Uckfield railway station is the southern terminus of a branch of the Oxted Line in England, serving the town of Uckfield, East Sussex.

The station and all trains that call are operated by Southern.

History 

The first station was opened in 1858 by the Lewes and Uckfield Railway Company. It was situated south of the High Street and became a through station when the line was extended northwards to Tunbridge Wells West in 1868.
After closure of the line south to Lewes in 1969, the original station found itself on the wrong side of the High Street level crossing, which created traffic congestion whenever a train was arriving or departing. It was therefore decided to close the original station and open a new station on the other side of the High Street. The present Uckfield station opened in 1991, replacing the original structure, which was sited  to the south. The original station was demolished on 9 December 2000, after having been damaged by flooding.

As part of Network Rail's national stations improvement programme, Uckfield received a new station building to replace the 1991 Portakabin-type structure which was deemed "not fit for purpose". The components for Uckfield's new station – including a ticket office, public toilet, staff accommodation, ticket hall and café – were manufactured by Britspace in Yorkshire and installed by contractors Bryen & Langley. The new building, which cost £750,000, was opened for passenger use on 16 March 2010.

Services 

On Sundays, this is reduced to an hourly shuttle to Oxted calling at all stations. Previously, most off-peak trains from Uckfield only went as far as Oxted, for interchange with East Grinstead line services. Since the service has been operated by Southern, most trains run through to London Bridge, and passenger numbers have risen. In December 2010, a later last train from London Bridge (at around 11 pm) was introduced, allowing passengers to return from London in the late evening.

Future

Platform extension
Platforms on the Uckfield branch of the Oxted Line were extended in 2016 to hold ten-carriage trains, to allow longer services to run during peak hours. To lengthen the trains to ten coaches, Southern acquired four Class 170 Turbostars from ScotRail. The Class 170s were converted to Class 171s to enable full compatibility with Southern's existing Class 171 fleet.

Electrification
Whereas the neighbouring East Grinstead line has 750 V DC electric traction, motive power on Uckfield line is provided by Class 171 diesel multiple units. It has been proposed many times that the line be electrified, but this is considered too expensive for the amount of passenger traffic. Rail usage figures published in March 2010 showed that journeys from the station increased by 179% in the five years to 2008/09.

Proposed Wealden Line reopening
Since 1986, there had been a campaign to re-open the line south of Uckfield through to Lewes, known as the Wealden Line, which has attracted cross-party support. In 2008, the "Wealdenlink" presentation was published, giving new impetus to the campaign for reinstatement. On 23 July 2008, a Network Rail study, commissioned by the Central Rail Corridor Board (a joint group of local councils and stakeholders), reported that there was no economic case for reopening, citing a £141 million cost and a low benefit–cost ratio of 0.64 to 0.79; a figure of 1.5 is the minimum required by the Department for Transport for a scheme to be considered viable.

References

External links 
Wealden line Campaign

Railway stations in East Sussex
Former London, Brighton and South Coast Railway stations
Railway stations in Great Britain opened in 1858
Railway stations in Great Britain closed in 1991
Railway stations in Great Britain opened in 1991
Railway stations served by Govia Thameslink Railway
Uckfield